Symplecis is a genus of parasitoid wasps belonging to the family Ichneumonidae.

The genus has almost cosmopolitan distribution.

Species:
 Symplecis alpicola Forster, 1871 
 Symplecis beaumontor Aubert, 1968

References

Ichneumonidae
Ichneumonidae genera